The Yamaha DT50MX is the most common  motorcycle in the Yamaha DT series. It superseded the DT50M when introduced in June 1981 and can easily be identified by its Mono-Cross(MX) rear suspension with a silver painted square-section rear swinging arm and a more angular tank as opposed to the more rounded one found on the M variant. The 'MX' designation was commonly used on Yamaha motorcycles fitted with the 'Mono-Cross' rear suspension, which was the first to employ a single shock-absorber. It remained in production largely unchanged until 1996, gaining only a CDI ignition system and a change to square bodied direction indicator lights in 1986 with the introduction of the 2FN model (sometimes referred to as the MX-S). The moped is very common in Scandinavia where its leading competitor was the Honda MT50 and can be ridden on a CBT at 16 in the UK.

An "LC" (liquid-cooled) model was released to the US and Europe, featuring a liquid-cooled 49cc engine, a taller fuel tank and a different headlight nacelle with a rectangular air vent beneath the headlamp.

Intake was by means of either a Mikuni vm18 smoothbore flatslide or a TK carburettor and the exhaust was expansion chamber type with interchangeable addons (BigOne and DEP manufactured an improved system),

There was also a Paris Dakar style bodykit available which featured a wraparound fairing incorporating a stationary headlamp nacelle, different side panels, sump guard and a tank cover, these were originally only available in white with red decals.

References
 Yamaha DT50 & 80 Trail bikes, Haynes

DT50MX
Two-stroke motorcycles
Motorcycles introduced in 1981